Yohan Soysa (born 28 November 1994) is a Sri Lankan cricketer. He made his first-class debut for Lankan Cricket Club in Tier B of the 2016–17 Premier League Tournament on 15 December 2016.

References

External links
 

1994 births
Living people
Sri Lankan cricketers
Sri Lanka Navy Sports Club cricketers
Cricketers from Colombo